Shōji, Shoji, Shouji or Shohji is a masculine Japanese given name written with various kanji (正治, 昌二, 昭二, etc.). Notable people with the name include: 

 Shoji Akiyoshi (born 1968), Japanese wrestler
 Shoji Gatoh (born 1971), Japanese author
 Shōji Hamada (1894–1978), Japanese potter
 Shoji Hashimoto (1935–2009), Japanese Go player
, Japanese architect
, Japanese rugby union player
, Japanese basketball player
 Shōji Kawamori (born 1960), Japanese anime creator
 Shoji Meguro (born 1971), Japanese video game composer
 Shōji Nishimura (1899–1944), Japanese Imperial Navy admiral
 Shoji Nishio (1927–2005), Japanese aikido teacher
, Japanese shogi player
 Shōji Shimazaki (1905-1982), birth name of Takashi Shimura, Japanese actor
 Shoji Tabuchi (born 1944), Japanese country musician
, Japanese footballer
 Shōji Yamagishi (1930–1979), photography critic, curator, and magazine editor
, Japanese actor
, Japanese sprint canoeist
, Japanese basketball player

Japanese masculine given names